Kyranycha fraudatrix is a species of beetle in the family Cerambycidae, and the only species in the genus Kyranycha. It was described by Henry Walter Bates in 1881.

References

Hemilophini
Beetles described in 1881